32 Orionis is a triple star system in the equatorial constellation of Orion. It has the Bayer designation A Orionis, while 32 Orionis is the Flamsteed designation. This system is visible to the naked eye as a faint point of light with a combined apparent visual magnitude of 4.20. It is located approximately 303 light-years away from the Sun based on parallax, and is drifting further away with a radial velocity of +18.6 km/s.

The system is a member of the eponymous 32 Orionis group, a young, nearby association of 46 co-moving stars first discovered in 2007.

The primary component of this system is a B-type main-sequence star with a stellar classification of B5V and a magnitude around 4.43. This is actually a spectroscopic binary with an orbital period of 3.964 days and eccentricity of 0.38. The unseen companion has an estimated mass of 0.6 times that of the Sun.

References

B-type main-sequence stars
Triple star systems
Spectroscopic binaries

Orion (constellation)
Durchmusterung objects
Orionis, A
Orionis, 32
036267
025813
1839